LWD may refer to:
 Large woody debris
 Logging while drilling, on oil wells
 Lotnicze Warsztaty Doświadczalne, a Polish aerospace manufacturer
 Leigh Warren and Dancers, now Dance Hub SA, Australian contemporary dance company